Sarah Lahti (born 18 February 1995) is a Swedish middle-distance runner. She competed in the 1500 metres at the 2016 IAAF World Indoor Championships without qualifying for the final. She is the current Swedish record holder in the half marathon, and previously held the Swedish record at 10,000 metres, which she set at the 2016 Summer Olympics.

Competition record

Personal bests
Outdoor
3000 metres – 8:50.97 (Utrecht 2016)
5000 metres – 15:10.76 (Hengelo 2016)
10000 metres – 31:28.43 (Rio de Janeiro 2016, former national record)
3000 metres steeplechase – 10:32.61 (Hässleholm 2012)
Half marathon - 1:09:52 (Dresden 2020, national record)

Indoor
1500 metres – 4:11.68 (Portland 2016)
One mile – 4:30.42 (Stockholm 2016)
3000 metres – 9:01.16 (Växjö 2016)

References

External links

1995 births
Living people
Swedish female middle-distance runners
Swedish female steeplechase runners
People from Klippan Municipality
Athletes (track and field) at the 2016 Summer Olympics
Olympic athletes of Sweden
Athletes (track and field) at the 2020 Summer Olympics
Sportspeople from Skåne County
20th-century Swedish women
21st-century Swedish women